Arrufat is a surname. Notable people with the surname include:

Andrés Piquer Arrufat (1711–1772), physician 
Antón Arrufat (born 1935), Cuban dramatist, novelist, short story writer, poet and essayist
Guillaume Arrufat (died 1311), Cardinal of the Roman Catholic Church
Antoni Vila Arrufat (1894–1989), Spanish engraver